Hot jazz may refer to:

 Dixieland
Hot Jazz (album), an album by Sarah Vaughan